Frank Bare Jr. is an American freestyle skier.  Bare was one of the sport's innovators and trained using a trampoline as well as on the aerials water ramps. In 1983, at Donner Ski Ranch, California, Bare performed the first quadruple somersault on skis. He did a triple twisting quadrupole back flip and did not wear a helmet. For nearly 20 years, no other skier performed a quadruple somersault onto snow.

Bare's father, Frank Bare Sr., was a notable American gymnastics executive.

References

American male freestyle skiers
Living people
Year of birth missing (living people)
Place of birth missing (living people)